Nikos Stavridis (1910 – 14 December 1987) was a Greek actor in film and theater.

Biography

He started his career at a musical theatre, he participated in shows, operettas and varieties.  In the 1940s, he began to make his own company and combined with famous stars especially Rena Vlachopoulou, the Kalouta sisters, Kaiti Diridaoua and Marika Nezer, also Kaiti Belinda and Marika Nezer (1958: Teddy Boys by Gialama-Thisviou-Pretenteris), also with Dionyssis Papayiannopoulos and Sofia Vembo in 1959, Costas Hadjihristos (1963), etc.  He took part in a space (1954–55) in which he worked together with Takis Miliaids and Nana Skiada in the Greek Musical Comedy in which raised his shows even it is a prose, even the comedy Ten Days in Paris with Dionyssis Papayiannopoulos (1960).  He entered even into film.  He played his first role in movies (I oraia ton Athinon, 1952), Orestis Laskos (I ftochia thelei kaloperassi, 1957, Ftohadakia ke leftades, 1960, O hazobabas, 1967), by Panos Glykofrydis (Douleies me fountes, 1958), by Alekos Sakellarios (The Yellow Gloves) Eftychos trelathika (1961) by Costas Andritsos and many more.

Filmography

As himself

Athens by Night [Η Αθήνα τη νύχτα, I Athina ti nychta] (1962) - as himself

External links

1910 births
1987 deaths
People from Samos
20th-century Greek male actors
Greek male stage actors
Greek male film actors
Greek comedians
20th-century comedians